The Battle of Petrikowka (present-day Petrykivka, Ukraine) took place between 27 and 30 September 1941, during World War II. Fought between Italian and Soviet forces, it was the first significant engagement involving the Italian Expeditionary Corps in Russia.

Formation of bridgeheads
On 16 September 1941 the 9th Motorised Division Pasubio was temporarily aggregated to the German 17th Army of Heeresgruppe Sud under Field Marshal von Rundstedt, and on 18 September it took position along the Oril river. On 23 September, the Pasubio Division created a bridgehead at Tsarytchanka, beyond the Dnieper river, in order to allow the German armoured units to cross to the other bank. Soviet forces launched heavy attacks against the bridgehead for three days, but it resisted; farther north, the 80th Infantry Regiment "Roma" (also part of the Pasubio Division) launched a surprise attack and created another bridgehead at Voinovka. These two bridgeheads allowed German armoured units to cross the river with their tanks and thus break through the Soviet lines.

Meanwhile, the 52nd Motorised Division Torino and the 63rd Assault Blackshirt Legion "Tagliamento" were transferred to Dnipropetrovsk, whereas the 3rd Cavalry Division Amedeo Duca d'Aosta was left to garrison the positions along the Dnieper and prepare for crossing.

Capture of Petrikowka
The German plan called now for encirclement of the Soviet forces, therefore a pincer movement, converging on the town of Petrikowka, was decided. The Italian Expeditionary Corps in Russia of General Giovanni Messe was tasked with this manoeuver; the Pasubio Division (now back under Italian command) would attack from north-east, and the Torino Division from south-east.

In the morning of 28 September 1941 the Torino Division attacked the Soviet forces, in order to broaden the bridgehead and reach Obuskvskje. Soviet forces opposed a tenacious resistance, but despite this and the minefields the Torino Division eventually broke through the lines held by the Soviet 47th Tank Division near Petrikowka.

On the following day, both the Torino and the Pasubio divisions were ordered to carry on with their advance towards Petrikowka, where the two divisions were to rejoin and thus cut off the Soviet retreat. At the same time, the Duca d'Aosta Division would send two Bersaglieri battalions on the other bank of the Dnieper, to start to sweep up the Soviet soldiers trapped in the pocket.
The two regiments of the Torino Division (81st and 82nd Infantry Regiment) and the Tagliamento Legion started their advance in the morning, clashing with several dissolving Soviet units and taking a number of prisoners. The vanguards of the Torino Division were the first to reach Petrikowka, where they met units from the Pasubio Division around 18:00. The Duca d'Aosta Division, after crossing the river, started the sweeping operations, and rejoined the other Italian units in Petrikowka in the evening. The sweeps continued on the following day.

Total Italian casualties numbered 291 men, of whom 87 were killed, 190 wounded and 14 missing. About 10,000 Soviet prisoners were captured, along with a large amount of weapons and quadrupeds.

Bibliography
 "Le operazioni delle unità italiane al fronte russo (1941–1943)", Italian Army Historical Branch, Rome, 1993
 Pierluigi Romeo di Colloredo, "Croce di ghiaccio", Genoa, 2010
 Leonardo Malatesta, "Storia della legione Tagliamento, Dalla fondazione alla guerra di Russia", vol 1°, Pietro Macchione Editore, Varese, 201.
Jowett, The Italian Army 1940–45 (3), pg.10
18th Army (Soviet Union)

References 

Petrikowka
Petrikowka
Petrikowka
1941 in the Soviet Union
Petrikowka
September 1941 events